New American Language is Iowa native singer/songwriter Dan Bern's first release with Messenger Records.

Track listing
Unless otherwise noted, all tracks by Dan Bern

"Sweetness" – 3:53
"New American Language" – 5:12
"Alaska Highway" – 4:05
"God Said No" – 5:31
"Turning Over" – 5:10
"Black Tornado" – 5:24
"Albuquerque Lullaby" – 3:54 
"Tape" – 3:37
"Honeydoo!" – 2:14
"Toledo" – 5:22
"Rice" – 5:30
"Thanksgiving Day Parade" – 10:27

Personnel 
Dan Bern – Organ, Guitar, Harmonica, Cello, Vocals, Illustrations, Paintings
Wil Masisak - Piano, Bass, Organ, Wurlitzer, Mellotron, Guitar, Clarinet, Glockenspiel, Vocals
Eben Grace - Guitar, Banjo
Brian Schey - Bass, Guitar, Vocals
Spanky Mahoney - Drums
Jake Coffin - Drums, Vocals
Paul Kuhn - Cellocaster
Lisa Donnelly - Vocals
Randy Kaplan - Vocals
Brent Berry & Clark Jamison - Percussion
Scott Watson - Tuba

References 

2001 albums
Dan Bern albums
Cooking Vinyl albums
Messenger Records albums
Albums produced by Chuck Plotkin